A Statement of Assets, Liabilities, and Net Worth (SALN) is an annual document that all government workers in the Philippines, whether regular or temporary, must complete and submit attesting under oath to their total assets and liabilities, including businesses and financial interests, that make up their net worth.  The assets and liabilities of the official, his or her spouse, and any unmarried children under 18 who are living at home, must be included.  Real property must be listed with the "description, kind, location, year and mode of acquisition, assessed value, fair market value, acquisition cost of land, building, etc. including improvements thereon". Any "co-mingled" assets, such as a house co-owned by siblings, must also be listed. Any gifts, donations, inheritances, or other properties received at no cost must be listed at the fair market value and the assessed value.

SALNs are required by law under Article XI Section 17 of the Philippine Constitution and Section 8 of Republic Act No. 6713, the Code of Conduct and Ethical Standards for Public Officials and Employees. It must be submitted upon assuming office and then every year thereafter on or before April 30. SALNs must be made available for inspection at reasonable hours and for copying by the public for a ten years after filing.

SALNs are often used by officials or political opponents to determine if government officials have "unexplained wealth", i.e. wealth that cannot be attributed to a salary, investment, gift, inheritance, or other legal sources and therefore are likely to have come from bribes, kickbacks, grease money or other forms of corruption. During the trial of Joseph Estrada, the 13th President of the Philippines, for plunder, his SALN played a key role.

References

Government of the Philippines
Politics of the Philippines